Operation Desert Scorpion may refer to:

 Operation Desert Scorpion (Iraq 1998), an unperformed military operation in 1998
 Operation Desert Scorpion (Iraq 2003), a military operation launched during the 2003 invasion of Iraq